A Technische Hochschule (plural: Technische Hochschulen, abbreviated TH) is a type of university focusing on engineering sciences in Germany. Previously, it also existed in Austria, Switzerland, the Netherlands, and Finland.

Terminology 

In German-language countries, the term Hochschule is more general than Universität (plural: Universitäten) and also encompasses universities which do not have the right to confer doctorates and habilitations, in contrast to Universitäten. Today, Universitäten as well as other Hochschulen call themselves Technische Hochschule for historical reasons. However, a Technische Hochschule with the status of a Universität is regarded as a Technische Universität despite the name.

History 

Since the Middle Ages, higher education institutions in Europe were called a university only if a certain classical canon of subjects encompassing philosophy, medicine, law and theology was taught. When engineering sciences became more important in academica due to the Industrial Revolution, institutions of tertiary education devoted to these were denied the prestigious denomination "university", and had to use the more general term Hochschule instead.

It was a major breakthrough, then, when in the first half of the 20th century, some Technische Hochschulen in Germany and Technische Hogescholen in the Netherlands were given the right to award the doctoral degrees, and again later when they were allowed to call themselves universities. This change of status was accompanied by a broader spectrum of academic disciplines and more fundamental research.

While most former Technische Hochschulen opted to change their name to Technische Universität to reflect their new status, some of them preferred to maintain their traditional and established names, most notably the RWTH Aachen in Germany as well as ETH Zurich and EPF Lausanne in Switzerland.

Starting in 2009, several German universities of applied sciences (Fachhochschulen) with a technical focus have changed their names to Technische Hochschule.

In Austria 

List of Austrian Technische Universitäten by location:

In Germany 

List of German Technische Universitäten by location:

List of Technische Hochschulen (institutions with the status of Technische Universität not included) by location:

In Switzerland 

List of Swiss Federal Institutes of Technology by location:

In Finland 

The concept of a TH exists also in Finland as teknillinen korkeakoulu, which is equivalent to a TH. Examples include Teknillinen korkeakoulu in Espoo, Tampereen teknillinen korkeakoulu and Lappeenrannan teknillinen korkeakoulu. Similarly to German speaking countries, most of them later changed their name to teknillinen yliopisto, which is equivalent to a TU. However, Teknillinen korkeakoulu retained its old name until it merged with two other universities to form the current Aalto University.

See also
TU9 German Institutes of Technology e. V. 
List of universities in Germany

References

Higher education
Types of university or college
Education in Austria
Higher education in Germany
Education in Switzerland